Pezhma is a rural locality (a settlement) in Morozovskoye Rural Settlement, Verkhovazhsky District, Vologda Oblast, Russia. The population was 383 as of 2002. There are 5 streets.

Geography 
Pezhma is located 34 km northwest of Verkhovazhye (the district's administrative centre) by road. Borovaya Pustosh is the nearest rural locality.

References 

Rural localities in Verkhovazhsky District